Niall Patterson (born 2 January 1962) is a former hurler who played as a goalkeeper for the Antrim senior team.

Patterson made his first appearance for the team during the 1979 "B" championship and was a regular member of the starting fifteen for over a decade. During that time he won two All-Ireland "B" medals and three Ulster medals.

At club level Patterson is an All-Ireland club medalist with Loughgiel Shamrocks. In addition to this he has also won one Ulster club medal and two county club championship medals.

Honours

Loughgiel Shamrocks
All-Ireland Senior Club Hurling Championship (1): 1983 (c)
Ulster Senior Club Hurling Championship (2): 1982 (c), 1989
Antrim Senior Club Hurling Championship (2): 1982 (c), 1989

Antrim
All-Ireland Senior B Hurling Championship (2): 1981, 1982
Ulster Senior Hurling Championship (3): 1989, 1990, 1991
Ulster Under-21 Hurling Championship (4): 1979, 1980, 1981, 1982

References

1962 births
Living people
Loughgiel Shamrocks hurlers
Antrim inter-county hurlers
Hurling goalkeepers